Tackner is an unincorporated community in Benton County, Missouri, United States.

A post office called Tackner was established in 1890, and remained in operation until 1911. The community has the name of the original owner of the town site.

References

Unincorporated communities in Benton County, Missouri
Unincorporated communities in Missouri